Nicole Marie Lachartre (27 February 1934 – 25 January 1991) was a French music writer and composer. She was born in Paris and studied at the Paris Conservatorie with Jean Rivier, Darius Milhaud and André Jolivet. She founded the Association pour la Collaboration des Interpretes et des Compositeurs to facilitate mixed electro-acoustic and instrumental performances. Lachartre published professional articles in journals including Journal of New Music Research and Diagrammes du monde. She died in Versailles.

Works
Lechartre composed for music theater, solo instrument, chamber ensemble, tape and mixed electroacoustic and instrumental music. Selected works include:
Pottcho I for flute
Pottcho II for flute
Music of Musicians Interrupted brass quintet
Babylone malde, ou la nuit du thermomètre {1981} mini-opéra comique
Viola Sonata (1964)
Pianoforte Sonata (1965)
Suicide cosmique (1970) for tape

Her publications include:
"Les musiques artificielles." Diagrammes du monde 146 (April 1969): 1-96.

References

1934 births
1991 deaths
20th-century classical composers
French classical composers
French women classical composers
Pupils of Darius Milhaud
20th-century women composers
20th-century French women